Frontina is a genus of flies in the family Tachinidae.

Species
F. adusta (Walker, 1853)
F. femorata Shima, 1988
F. laeta (Meigen, 1824)

References

Exoristinae
Diptera of Europe
Diptera of Asia
Tachinidae genera
Taxa named by Johann Wilhelm Meigen